A prawn roll is a sandwich item available in areas of Australia, where prawn fishing is a major industry.

See also
 List of sandwiches
 List of seafood dishes
 List of stuffed dishes

References

Australian breads
Australian cuisine
Shrimp dishes
Seafood sandwiches
Stuffed dishes